The 1943 Tour of Flanders was held in 1943.

General classification

Final general classification

References
Résultats sur siteducyclisme.net
Résultats sur cyclebase.nl
Résultats sur les-sports.info

External links
 

Tour of Flanders
1943 in road cycling
1943 in Belgian sport